The 1983 Women's Junior World Handball Championship was the fourth edition of the tournament which took place in France from 14 to 22 October 1983.

Sixteen teams competed in the competition from three continents with three nations debuting in the competition. The gold medal went to the Soviet Union who claimed their third title after defeating East Germany by five goals in the final. South Korea finished in third after defeating Yugoslavia.

Group stage

Group A

Group B

Group C

Group D

Second round

Group I

Group II

Placement round

Group III

Group IV

Placement matches

Fifteen place game

Thirteenth place game

Eleventh place game

Ninth place game

Seventh place game

Fifth place game

Third place game

Final

Ranking
The final rankings from the 1983 edition:

References

External links 

Women's Junior World Handball
Women's Junior World Handball Championship, 1983
1983
Junior Handball
Women's handball in France